John D'Leo (born July 8, 1995) is an American actor. He is known for his role in the 2013 film The Family, as well as the films Unbroken (2014), Cop Out (2010), Brooklyn's Finest (2010), and Wanderlust (2012). He has also starred in the television series Law & Order: Special Victims Unit and How to Make It in America.

Early life 
D'Leo was born on July 8, 1995 in Monmouth County, New Jersey, to parents Ginna and Chuck D'Leo. He is of Italian and Irish descent.

Acting career 
D'Leo started his career acting in commercials, and later started acting in television and films. His first main role was in the 2008 film The Wrestler.

He later went on to become known for his role in the 2013 film The Family, alongside Robert De Niro, Michelle Pfeiffer, and Diana Agron.

Filmography

Film

Television

References

External links

1995 births
21st-century American male actors
American male film actors
American male television actors
American people of Italian descent
American people of Irish descent
Living people